Cristina Chiuso is a former Italian swimmer.

Italian record holder of 50 freestyle and 4x100 freestyle relay in short and long course, was captain of Italian women swimming team.

She has participated four times at the Olympic Games (Barcelona 1992, Sydney 2000, Athens 2004, Beijing 2008) and 5 times at the Swimming world championships (Fukuoka 2001, Barcelona 2003, Montreal 2005, Melbourne 2007, Rome 2009). She has won two silver medals at the Swimming European Championships with the 4x100 freestyle relay team (2000 Helsinki and Eindhoven 2008), a silver medal at the European short course swimming championship in (Trieste 2005), one gold, three silver and two bronze medals at the Mediterranean Games and a total of 41 individual gold medals at the Italian Swimming Championships.

Cristina announced his retirement in October 2009 after the world swimming championship in Rome.

Now she is a sport marketing manager and a TV commentator for Sky Sport.

See also
 Swimming at the 2004 Summer Olympics – Women's 4 × 100 metre freestyle relay
 Swimming at the 2004 Summer Olympics – Women's 4 × 200 metre freestyle relay
 Swimming at the 2004 Summer Olympics – Women's 50 metre freestyle
 Italy at the 1992 Summer Olympics
 Italy at the 2000 Summer Olympics
 Italy at the 2004 Summer Olympics
 European Short Course Swimming Championships 2005
 2000 European Aquatics Championships
 European Short Course Swimming Championships 2006

References
Cristina Chiuso on agendadiana.com
 Cristina Chiuso on Italian Swimming Federation's website  
 Cristina Chiuso on nuotopedia.eu 

1973 births
Living people
People from San Donà di Piave
Italian female swimmers
Olympic swimmers of Italy
Swimmers at the 1992 Summer Olympics
Swimmers at the 2000 Summer Olympics
Swimmers at the 2004 Summer Olympics
Swimmers at the 2008 Summer Olympics
European Aquatics Championships medalists in swimming
Mediterranean Games gold medalists for Italy
Mediterranean Games bronze medalists for Italy
Swimmers at the 2005 Mediterranean Games
Universiade medalists in swimming
Mediterranean Games medalists in swimming
Universiade silver medalists for Italy
Medalists at the 1999 Summer Universiade
Sportspeople from the Metropolitan City of Venice
21st-century Italian women